Jean-Claude Coquet (29 March 1928 – 16 January 2023) was a French linguist and semiotician.

Publications
Sémiotique littéraire. Contribution à l'analyse sémantique du discours (1973)
Le discours et son sujet I. Essai de grammaire modale (1984)
Le discours et son sujet II.  Pratique de la grammaire modale (1985)
La Quête du sens. Le Langage en question (1997)
Phusis et Logos. Une Phénoménologie du langage (2007)
Phénoménologie du langage (2022)

References

1928 births
2023 deaths
French semioticians
Academic staff of Paris 8 University Vincennes-Saint-Denis
Academic staff of the University of Poitiers
People from Sens